Bustos is a surname of noble origin from Northern Spain, more precisely of La Rioja. The surname has its origins in the 11th century.
The surname has expanded to the Americas in the 17th century mostly in Argentina, Mexico and Chile.

Notable people with the surname include:

 Arturo García Bustos (1926–2017), Mexican painter
 Cheri Bustos (born 1961), U.S. Representative for Illinois's 17th congressional district
 Cristian Bustos (born 1983), Spanish football player
 Crystl Bustos (born 1977), Mexican-American softball player
 Diego Daniel Bustos (born 1974), retired Argentine football striker
 David Bustos (born 1990), Spanish athlete
 Diego Bustos (born 1971), Argentine news anchor
 Eduardo Bustos Montoya (born 1976), Argentine football striker
 Fabián Bustos (born 1969), Argentine football coach and former player
 Fabricio Bustos (born 1996), Argentine football player
 Graciela Bustos, Colombian artist
 H. Bustos Domecq, pseudonym used for several collaborative works by the Argentine writers Jorge Luis Borges (1899–1986) and Adolfo Bioy Casares (1914–1999)
 Isaac Bustos (born 1975), Mexican boxer
 Joey Bustos, American drummer and member of the band Link 80, active 1993–present
 Juan Bustos (1935–2008), Chilean politician
 Judith Bustos (born 1945), better known as Tigresa del Oriente, Peruvian singer
 Marco Bustos (born 1996), Canadian soccer player
 Martín Bustos Moyano (born 1985), Argentine rugby union player
 Maximiliano Bustos (born 1982), Argentine football midfielder
 Mikey Bustos (born 1981), Filipino-Canadian singer
 Ramón Moreno Bustos (born 1966), Spanish politician
 Rubén Darío Bustos (born 1981), Colombian football player
 Sergio Bustos (born 1972), retired Argentine football player
 Vanessa Alexandra Mendoza Bustos (born 1981), better known as Vanessa Mendoza, Colombian fashion model